Ali Ibrahim Karim Al-Zubaidi (born 1 March 2002), known as Ali Al-Hamadi, is an Iraqi professional footballer who plays as a forward for League Two side AFC Wimbledon and the Iraq national football team.

Early life
Ali was born in Maysan, Iraq on 1 March 2002. In 2003 during the early stages of the Iraq War, at the age of 1, he and his family moved from Iraq to Toxteth, Liverpool where they would settle and he would grow up.

Al-Hamadi’s father, Ibrahim, who was studying to become a lawyer at that point, was part of a peaceful protest against the dictatorship of Saddam Hussein and he ended up being jailed. His wife was pregnant, and his father with help, was released and made his way to the UK. Like most Iraqis fleeing the war, Ali initially went to Jordan with his mother before they reunited with his father in Britain. The first time he met his father he was one year and 4 months old .

Club career

Early career 
In 2015, Al-Hamadi was selected to play for Liverpool Schoolboys at the age of 13 where he quickly made an impression and caught the attention of Everton and Liverpool, but ended up joining Tranmere Rovers. Ali joined Tranmere’s under-14s and stayed with the club for three years, being offered a professional contract in the summer of 2018 but he instead opted for a two-year scholarship at Swansea City.

Al-Hamadi left Liverpool and his family to move to Wales as he joined Swansea City’s academy in the summer of 2018, joining on a two-year scholarship. On 2 July 2020, Al-Hamadi signed his first professional contract with Swansea, signing a one-year contract with the club.

In September 2021, Al-Hamadi went on trial with Derby County, scoring for their under-23 side in a 3–3 Premier League Cup draw against the Norwich City under-23s.

Wycombe Wanderers
On 20 November 2021, Al-Hamadi signed an eighteen-month contract with League One side Wycombe Wanderers, following a successful trial period at the club.

Bromley (loan)
On 11 March 2022, Al-Hamadi joined National League side Bromley on loan until the end of the 2021–22 season.

AFC Wimbledon
On 12 January 2023, Al-Hamadi completed a permanent transfer to League Two side AFC Wimbledon on a two-and-a-half year deal. He scored his first goal for Wimbledon on 18 February 2023 in a 2-2 draw with Hartlepool United.

International career
Al-Hamadi was eligible to play for both England and Iraq at international level and accepted a call-up to the Iraq U23 team in 2019, declaring for the country of his birth.

Iraq U23
In late 2019, Al-Hamadi received and accepted an invitation from the Iraq under-23s to join them in their preparations for the 2020 AFC U-23 Championship. Ali made his debut for and scored his first goal in October 2019. He was not included in the squad for the final tournament due to an injury he picked up at the training camp.

Iraq
Ali received his first call-up to the senior national team in November 2021 as part of Iraq’s squad for their 2022 FIFA World Cup qualifiers against South Korea and Syria, with  striker Iraq’s first choice striker Mohanad Ali out injured and Alaa Abbas still regaining fitness after his injury. Al-Hamadi was named in the starting line-up and made his debut on 11 November in a 1–1 draw against Syria before gaining his second cap in a 3–0 loss to South Korea on 16 November, playing the full match.

Personal life
Ali Al-Hamadi was born in Amarah, Maysan to parents from both Amarah and Al Diwaniyah

Al-Hamadi got 4 A*s, 4 As and a B in his GCSEs.

Ali has two younger siblings, a brother and sister who were both born after the family moved to England.

Honours 
Bromley
FA Trophy: 2021–22

References 

2002 births
Living people
People from Maysan Governorate
Iraqi emigrants to the United Kingdom
Iraqi footballers
Association football forwards
Tranmere Rovers F.C. players
Swansea City A.F.C. players
Wycombe Wanderers F.C. players
Bromley F.C. players
AFC Wimbledon players
National League (English football) players
English Football League players
Iraq youth international footballers
Iraq international footballers